Thomas Ludwig Betzwieser (born 23 March 1958 in Neckarhausen near Heidelberg) is a German musicologist and opera scholar. He became a member of the Akademie der Wissenschaften und der Literatur in 2015.

Betzwieser is the author of books including:
Sprechen und Singen: Ästhetik und Erscheinungsformen der Dialogoper (2002)
Exotismus und „Türkenoper“ in der französischen Musik des Ancien Régime (1993)

References

External links 
 Thomas Betzwieser in WorldCat
 Thomas Betzwieser – Homepage (with list of publications)
 OPERA – Spektrum des europäischen Musiktheaters in Einzeleditionen
 
 Profile at Akademie der Wissenschaften und der Literatur

1958 births
Living people
People from Rhein-Neckar-Kreis
Writers from Baden-Württemberg
20th-century German musicologists
21st-century German musicologists